Shah-Kaykhusraw was the ruler of the Bavand dynasty from 1310 to 1328. He was the brother and successor of Shahriyar V.

Reign
Shahriyar V died in 1310, leaving his kingdom to a weakened condition, which quickly fell into war of succession between Shah-Kaykhusraw, and his brother Shams al-Muluk Muhammad. Shah-Kaykhusraw, with the support of the Ilkhanid Kutlushah, invaded Mazandaran and forced Shams al-Muluk to flee. However, he later returned to Mazandaran, but was killed by Shah-Kaykhusraw, who then crowned himself as the ispahbadh of the Bavand kingdom.

Shah-Kaykhusraw later became involved in a conflict with Kutlushah, and was forced to leave Amol with his family and to take refugee in the domains of his brother-in-law, the Baduspanid king, Nasir al-Din Shahriyar, who later tried to help Shah-Kaykhusraw defeat Kutlushah, and seems to have had some successes in his effort, but was defeated. Shah-Kaykhusraw remained a refugee until Talish Chubani became the governor of Khorasan, in 1317, when Shah-Kaykhusraw restored Bavand authority in Mazandaran. Shah-Kaykhusraw died in 1328, and was succeeded by his son, Sharaf al-Muluk.

Sources
 

14th-century Bavandid rulers
1328 deaths
Year of birth unknown